This is a list of films produced by the Tollywood film industry based in Hyderabad in the year 1956. Movies released 27

References

1956
Telugu
Telugu films